Tilting Train Express (TTX) or Hanvit 200 is a South Korean experimental high-speed tilting train, which is currently being tested by the Korea Railroad Research Institute (KRRI).

Technical details

The carbody is made on an aluminum honeycomb structure sandwiched between a carbon/epoxy composite material, reducing carbody mass by 40%. The interior design of two of the powered cars provides for 29 First Class seats in 2+1 configuration, that of the other two powered cars 56 Standard Class seats in 2+2 configuration, that of unpowered end cars 54 Standard Class seats.

History

TTX was presented to the public on January 16, 2007, when the first test run was planned for the next month.  The actual first test was conducted on April 2, 2007, on the Chungbuk Line.

Following a call by Nam-Hee Chae, the president of the Korea Railroad Research Institute, for proposals for a generic name for Korean-made high-speed trains, on April 5, 2007, Chae announced the name Hanvit (Hangul: 한빛), which means a streak of intense light in Korean.  Under the new naming scheme, TTX became Hanvit 200.

The first test run with active tilting was conducted in the presence of the media on May 22, 2007, between Osong Station and nearby Ogeunjang Station on the Chungbuk Line. At the time, the train was planned to enter service in 2010. In a further test in September 2010 on the not yet opened second stage of the line between Daegu and Busan, the train achieved .

Series version 

By the end of 2009, the series version of the train was expected to enter regular service in 2013, starting on the Jungang Line.  The future service is expected to reduce the travel time between Cheongnyangni in Seoul and Yeongju from the current Mugunghwa-ho travel time of 3 hours 25 minutes to 2 hours 55 minutes, further reducing to 1 hour 55 minutes after the upgrade of the Jungang Line.  Further services are planned on the Taebaek and Yeongdong Lines.

See also
HSR-350x
HEMU-430X
Korea Train Express
New Pendolino
X 2000
Transportation in South Korea

References

High-speed trains of South Korea
Tilting trains
25 kV AC multiple units
Hyundai Rotem multiple units